First Lady of Malta or First Gentleman of Malta is the title and position held by the spouse of the president of Malta, concurrent with the president's term in office. The current titleholder is First Lady Miriam Vella, who has held the position since April 2019.

The president and their husbands or wives reside at the San Anton Palace.

List of first ladies and gentlemen 

This list includes all persons who have served as First Lady or First Gentleman.

References

Malta